Oruç Güvenç (1948 - July 5, 2017) was a Turkish Sufi master, musician, music therapist, ethnomusicologist and a poet. Widely considered as one of the most influential figures in Turkish music, Güvenç authored many classical Turkish and Sufi compositions.

Biography
Güvenç was born in 1948 in Tavşanlı district of Kütahya. He was the second child of Ahmet Kamil Güvenç and Urkiye Güvenç. He completed his primary and secondary education in İstiklal Primary School and Tavşanlı Secondary School. After completing his high school education at Kütahya High School, Güvenç studied philosophy and graduated from Istanbul University. He earned his doctorate in clinical psychology from Cerrahpasa Faculty of Medicine and became an expert on music therapy. Later, he founded the Center for Research and Application of Turkish Music at Cerrahpaşa Medical Faculty. Güvenç started his music life by taking violin lessons from Fethi Bey while he was in secondary school. During his university years he learned to play oud, rebab, ney and drum. In 1975, he founded TÜMATA, an organisation to study and promote Turkish Music. Güvenç taught at Istanbul University and, from 1991 to 1996, served as the head of the university's Music Ethnology, Research and Music Therapy department. He was awarded an honorary professorship by Fergana University in 1992. In the same year, he was also honoured by the Argentine Academia de las Naciones. Oruç Güvenç passed away on 5 July 2017 in İstanbul. He was buried in Karacaahmet Cemetery.

Works
Oruç Güvenç authored two books and many compositions.

Albums
 Ocean of Remembrance (1995)
 Rivers of One (1997)

Books
 Music Therapy: Hüseyin Makam
 The Beloved of Allah - Hazret Mevlana

References

1948 births
2017 deaths
Turkish Sufis
20th-century Turkish male musicians
21st-century Turkish male musicians
Burials at Karacaahmet Cemetery
People from Tavşanlı